This is a list of religious buildings in Nepal.

List 

 List of Buddhist temples in Nepal
 List of cathedrals in Nepal
 List of churches in Nepal
 List of monasteries in Nepal
 List of temples in Nepal
 List of stupas in Nepal
 List of mosques in Nepal
 List of synagogues in Nepal